St John's Cathedral, today known as Gospel Church, is a Protestant church situated on Yangtianjing Street in the county-level city of Langzhong, Nanchong, Sichuan Province. Founded in 1908, the church was formerly the Anglican cathedral of the Szechwan Diocese of the Church in China, and the largest Anglican church in Southwest China. Originally designated as a pro-cathedral.

History 

The first Anglican church in Langzhong (then known as Langchung, Paoning or Paoning Foo [Baoning / Baoning Fu]), the Trinity Church, built in 1893, had become too small as the number of converts had increased.

After a series of problems, St John's was eventually built on Yangtianjing Street, under the supervision of William Cassels, one of the Cambridge Seven, and the then missionary bishop in the Diocese of Western China. Construction began in 1913 and finished in 1914.

The cathedral was designed by the Australian architect George A. Rogers, and built in the fusion of neo-Gothic and traditional Sichuanese architectural styles. It occupies an area of nearly 4000 square metres, with a cemetery, a library, a well, a flower garden and a vegetable garden. Cassels died in 1925 and buried in the garden of St John's. Montagu Proctor-Beauchamp, also one of the Cambridge Seven, was buried in the cemetery of the cathedral in 1939.

After the communist takeover of China in 1949, Christian Churches in China were forced to sever their ties with respective overseas Churches, which has thus led to the merging of St John's into the communist-established Three-Self Patriotic Church.

See also 
 Anglicanism in Sichuan
 Gospel Church, Wanzhou
 St John's Church, Chengdu
 :Category:Former Anglican churches in Sichuan

References 

20th-century Anglican church buildings
20th-century churches in China
Anglican cathedrals in China
Protestant churches in China
Langzhong
Langzhong
Churches completed in 1914
Religious organizations established in 1908
Buildings and structures in Nanchong